Valerie Bott   is a museum consultant and historian. She is the chairperson of the William Hogarth Trust. Bott was awarded an MBE in the 2014 Birthday Honours for services to heritage and conservation. She was elected as a Fellow of the Society of Antiquaries of London on 27 February 2020.

References

Living people
Year of birth missing (living people)
Fellows of the Society of Antiquaries of London
Women historians
Members of the Order of the British Empire